Hasna Begum (24 February 1935 – 1 December 2020) was a Bangladeshi philosopher and feminist, and a professor of philosophy at the University of Dhaka until her retirement in December 2000.

Education and career 

She earned her BA (1968) and MA (1969) from the University of Dhaka and her PhD (1978) in moral philosophy from Monash University, where she was the first doctoral advisee of Australian philosopher Peter Singer. The title of her doctoral dissertation was Moore’s Ethics: Theory and Practice. Begum was a prolific author, and translated a number of philosophical classics into Bengali.

Begum served as chair of the Department of Philosophy at the University of Dhaka from 1991 to 1994 and was appointed to the University Grants Commission (UGC) of Bangladesh's Rokeya Chair in 2010. She was a board member of the International Association of Bioethics (IAB) from 1997 to 2005, was a member of the editorial board of Bioethics, and was a member of the editorial board of the Eubios Journal of Asian and International Bioethics (EJAIB).

Death
Begum died from COVID-19 at a hospital in Dhaka, Bangladesh, on 1 December 2020, during the COVID-19 pandemic in Bangladesh. She was 85.

Publications

Books
 3 Books of Poems, a collection of poems published in Poetry Monash between 1975 and 1978.
 Moore’s Ethics: Theory and Practice, Dhaka University, Dhaka, 1982.
 G. E. Moore’s Principia Ethica, translation in Bengali, Bangla Academy, Dhaka, 1985.
 J. S. Mill’s Utilitarianism, translation in Bengali, Bangla Academy, Dhaka, 1985 and 2nd edition 1997, 3rd edition, 4th edition; Indian 1st edition 2016, Kolkata; 5th edition, Dhaka, 2017.
 Rupe Arupe Madonna (Bengali), Dhaka, 1986.
 Morality, Women and Society, a compilation of articles (Bengali), Bangla Academy, Dhaka, 1990.
 Women in the Developing World: Thoughts and Ideals, a compilation of articles, Sterling Publishers, New Delhi, India, 1990; 2nd edition, Dhaka, 2009. 
 Madonna Echoes and Vibrations, Academic Publishers, Dhaka, 1996.
 Ethics in Social Practice, Academia Publishers, Dhaka, 2001; 2nd edition, Dhaka 2010.
 Women and Other Issues (Bengali), Hakkani, Dhaka, 2002.
 Nicomachean Ethics, translation in Bengali, Dhaka University, 2006.
 Meyer Katha Mayer Katha Meyeder Katha (Bengali), February 2008, Dhaka.
 On Old Age and Others, February 2008, Dhaka.
 Madhabeer Katha, a novel (Bengali), Dhaka, 2009.
 Windows into Living, Academic Publishers, 2011. 
 Begum Rokeya the Feminist: Thoughts and Ideals, Dhaka, 2011.
 Amar Sonar Harin Chai (After the Golden Deer; Bengali), Memoirs. vol. 1, 2015.
 Darshaniker Galpa (Stories of Philosophers; Bengali), vol. 1, Dhaka, 2016.

Articles

 "Plato’s Communism" (Bengali), Darshan (Philosophy), Dhaka University, 1972.
 "Is Moore a Consistent Utilitarian?", Dhaka University Studies, December 1978.
 "Some Comments on Moore’s Method of Isolation," Indian Philosophical Quarterly, July 1979.
 "Moore on Goodness and the Naturalistic Fallacy," Australasian Journal of Philosophy, September 1979.
 "Morality and Social Values" (Bengali), Darshan, December 1979.
 "Women in Plato’s Republic" (Bengali), Dhaka Vishvabidyalaya Patrika, June 1980.
 "Moore’s Ethics and the Bloomsbury Group," Dhaka University Studies, June 1981.
 "Begum Rokeya the Rationalist and Rights of Women" (Bengali), Sahitya Patrika (Journal of Literature), Dhaka University, December 1980-June 1981.
 "Moore in Principia Ethica," Dhaka Vishvabidyalaya Patrika (Bengali version of Dhaka University Studies), June 1981.
 "Natural, Non-natural and Supersensible Qualities," Dhaka University Studies, June 1981.
 "Academic Environment," Federation of Bangladesh University Teachers Associations.
 "Dev’s New Morality and Progress," Philosophy and Progress, Dhaka University, July 1982.
 "Humanism and the Future of Man," Philosophy and Progress, Dhaka University, July 1983.
 "Women in Qathafi’s Green Book," Journal of the Asiatic Society of Bangladesh, December 1983.
 "Animal Liberation: A New Perspective in Ethics" (Bengali), Philosophy and Progress, Dhaka University, July 1984.
 "Moral Crisis in Bangladesh" (Bengali), Bangladesh Darshan Patrika (Bangladesh Journal of Philosophy), 1985.
 "Socio-Economic Philosophy and Bangladesh" (Bengali), Bangladesh Darshan Patrika (Bangladesh Journal of Philosophy), 1986.
 "Moral Code of Women in Islam: An Egalitarian Analysis," Philosophy and Progress, Dhaka University, June–December 1986.
 "Mass Media and Women in Bangladesh," South Asia, Australia, New Series, Vol. 9, No. 1, June 1986.
 "Marital Status of Women in the Folktales of Bangladesh," Journal of the Asiatic Society of Bangladesh, December 1987.
 "Public and Private Morality," Philosophy and Progress, Dhaka University, December 1987.
 "Bangla Katha Sahitye Nar-Nari Samparka" (Man-Woman Relationship in Bengali Fiction), Samakaleen Bangla Sahitya (Bengali), The Asiatic Society of Bangladesh, 1988.
 "Marital status of women in the Folklore of Bangladesh," Lilith: A Feminist History Journal, No. 4, 1988, pp. 15–28.
 "Virginia Wolf and Women Liberation," Philosophy and Progress, Dhaka University, June–December 1989.
 "Quota System for Women in Job Selection in Bangladesh: Moral Justifications" (Bengali), Dhaka Vishvabidyalaya Patrika, June 1988.
 "Utilitarianism: Theory and Present Context" (Bengali), Dhaka Vishvabidyalaya Patrika, February 1989.
 "Rights of Women in Bangladesh: An Examination," Journal of the Asiatic Society of Bangladesh, 1990.
 "Philosophy of Baul Sect," Philosophical Thoughts of Bangladesh, The Asiatic Society of Bangladesh, 1992.
 "Begum Rokeya: Humanism and liberation of women," in: B. M. Mafizul Islam Patwari (ed.), Humanism and Human Rights in the Third World, Aligarh Library, 1992.
 "Family Planning and the Social Position of Women," Bioethics, Vol. 7, No. 2-3, April 1993.
 A Roundtable article on Contraceptive in Reproductive Health Matters, London, November 1994.
 "Violence in Islamic Texts and Its Relevance to Practice," in: Shefali Moitra (ed.), Women Heritage and Violence, School of Women Studies, Jadavpur University, India, May 1996.
 "Issues Related to Implementation of Reproduction Technology in Islamic Societies," Bioethics, Vol. 11, No. 4, 1997.
 "Relevance of Genetic Information in a Developing Country," IAB News, Issue 8, Autumn 1998.
 "Health care, ethics and nursing in Bangladesh: a personal perspective," Nursing Ethics, Vol. 5, No. 6, 1998.
 "Evolution of the Practice of Morality and Moral Science in Bangladesh", (Bengali), Amar Ekushey Baktritamala, Bangla Academy, 2000.
 "Evolved man-woman Relationship and Future Family" (Bengali), Lokayata, Dhaka, September 2000.
 "Ethics, Aesthetics and Human Existence in G. E. Moore," Existence, Experience and Ethics, New Delhi, India, 2000.
 "Poverty and Health Ethics in Developing Countries," Bioethics, Vol. 15, No. 1, February 2001.
 "New Reproduction Technologies: Women’s Concern," Empowerment, Vol. 8, Women for Women, Dhaka, 2001.
 "Ethics in the Biotechnology Century: Bangladesh Report," in: Abu Bakar Abdul Majeed (ed.), Bioethics: Ethics in the Biotechnology Century, Institute of Islamic Understanding Malaysia, Kuala Lumpur, 2002.
 "Rokeya’s Literature: Politics in Different Perspectives," in: Alam, F. & Azim, F. (ed.), Politics and Culture, English Department, Dhaka University, January 2002.
 "Is Simone de Beauvoir Sartre’s Second Fiddle?" (Bengali), Natun Diganta, Vol. 1, No. 1, Chowdhury, S. I. (ed.), Dhaka, October 2002.
 "Bioethics in Bangladesh," Regional Perspectives in Bioethics, Swets & Zeitlinger, the Netherlands, 2003.
 "Two Persons in Two Colonies: Rokeya and Kartini" (Bengali), Natun Diganta, Vol. 2, No. 1, Chowdhury, S. I. (ed.), Dhaka, 2003.
 "Moral Education in Primary, Secondary and Tertiary Levels in Bangladesh" (Bengali), Amar Ekushe Baktritamala, Bangla Academy, 2003.
 "Reproductive Technologies: Implementation and Human Predicament" (Bengali), Natun Diganta, Vol. 2, No. 4, Chowdhury, S. I. (ed.), Dhaka, 2004.
 "Indian Films: The Unforgettable Three Actresses" (Bengali), Dhrupadi, Dhaka, 2004.
 "Response to Genetics, Theology, Ethics," in: Cahill, Lisa (ed.), Genetics, Theology Ethics: An Interdisciplinary Approach, Crossword/ Herder, New York, 2005.
 "Thoughts on Old Age" (Bengali), Natun Diganta, Vol. 3, No. 4, Chowdhury, S. I. (ed.), Dhaka, 2005.
 "About the True Nature of Perfect Friendship" (Bengali), Natun Diganta, Vol. 3, No. 1, Chowdhury, S. I. (ed.), Dhaka, 2005.
 "Progress in Knowledge and Social Reality" (Bengali), Vol. 4, Natun Diganta, Chowdhury, S. I. (ed.), Dhaka, 2005.
 "Moral Education for Young Students" (Bengali), Vol. 4, No. 4, Natun Diganta, Chowdhury, S. I. (ed.), Dhaka, 2006.
 "Research Ethics and Unprotected People of Developing Countries" (Bengali), Natun Diganta, Vol. 5, No. 1, Chowdhury, S. I. (ed.), Dhaka, 2006.
 "Children like yours" (with Rainer Ebert), bdnews24.com, 3 October 2012.

References

External links

Obituary for Hasna Begum, by Rainer Ebert
"From a housewife to professor," Dhaka Courier (February 1, 2018)

1935 births
2020 deaths
20th-century philosophers
21st-century philosophers
Analytic philosophers
Bangladeshi philosophers
Academic staff of the University of Dhaka
Monash University alumni
Bioethicists
Feminist writers
Bangladeshi feminists
Bangladeshi feminist writers
Deaths from the COVID-19 pandemic in Bangladesh